The Mendocino and Headlands Historic District is a nationally recognized and locally protected historic district in Mendocino, California. It is bounded roughly by the Pacific Ocean on the west and south,  Little Lake Street on the north and California State Route 1 on the east. It is filled with historic late 19th Century buildings built from local redwood, such as the Mendocino Presbyterian Church and the Masonic Hall.  Because of its resemblance to coastal villages in New England and the Maritime Provinces of Canada, it has been used often as the location for movies such as Johnny Belinda (1947) with Jane Wyman and Lew Ayres, which was set in Prince Edward Island, and TV series such as Murder She Wrote (1984–1996) with Angela Lansbury, which was set in Maine.

On July 14, 1971, it was added to the National Register of Historic Places. It is also protected by historic preservation provisions enacted by the Mendocino County government. A visitor's center and museum are located in the historic Ford House.

See also
 Mendocino Headlands State Park

References

Protected areas of Mendocino County, California
Historic districts on the National Register of Historic Places in California
National Register of Historic Places in Mendocino County, California